

Events

Pre-1600
 332 – Emperor Constantine the Great announces free distributions of food to the citizens in Constantinople.
 872 – Louis II of Italy is crowned for the second time as Holy Roman Emperor at Rome, at the age of 47. His first coronation was 28 years earlier, in 844, during the reign of his father Lothair I.
1096 – First Crusade: Around 800 Jews are massacred in Worms, Germany.
1152 – The future Henry II of England marries Eleanor of Aquitaine. He would become king two years later, after the death of his cousin once removed King Stephen of England.
1268 – The Principality of Antioch, a crusader state, falls to the Mamluk Sultan Baibars in the Siege of Antioch.
1291 – Fall of Acre, the end of Crusader presence in the Holy Land.
1302 – Bruges Matins, the nocturnal massacre of the French garrison in Bruges by members of the local Flemish militia.
1388 – During the Battle of Buyur Lake, General Lan Yu leads a Ming army forward to crush the Mongol hordes of Tögüs Temür, the Khan of Northern Yuan.
1499 – Alonso de Ojeda sets sail from Cádiz on his voyage to what is now Venezuela.
1565 – The Great Siege of Malta begins, in which Ottoman forces attempt and fail to conquer Malta.
1593 – Playwright Thomas Kyd's accusations of heresy lead to an arrest warrant for Christopher Marlowe.

1601–1900
1631 – In Dorchester, Massachusetts, John Winthrop takes the oath of office and becomes the first Governor of Massachusetts.
1652 – Slavery in Rhode Island is abolished, although the law is not rigorously enforced.
1695 – The 1695 Linfen earthquake in Shannxi, Ming dynasty causes extreme damage and kills at least 52,000 people.
1756 – The Seven Years' War begins when Great Britain declares war on France.
1783 – First United Empire Loyalists reach Parrtown (later called Saint John, New Brunswick), Canada, after leaving the United States. 
1794 – Battle of Tourcoing during the Flanders Campaign of the War of the First Coalition.
1803 – Napoleonic Wars: The United Kingdom revokes the Treaty of Amiens and declares war on France.
1804 – Napoleon Bonaparte is proclaimed Emperor of the French by the French Senate.
1811 – Battle of Las Piedras: The first great military triumph of the revolution of the Río de la Plata in Uruguay led by José Artigas.
1812 – John Bellingham is found guilty and sentenced to death by hanging for the assassination of British Prime Minister Spencer Perceval.
1843 – The Disruption in Edinburgh of the Free Church of Scotland from the Church of Scotland.
1848 – Opening of the first German National Assembly (Nationalversammlung) in Frankfurt, Germany.
1860 – United States presidential election: Abraham Lincoln wins the Republican Party presidential nomination over William H. Seward, who later becomes the United States Secretary of State.
1863 – American Civil War: The Siege of Vicksburg begins.
1896 – The United States Supreme Court rules in Plessy v. Ferguson that the "separate but equal" doctrine is constitutional.
  1896   – Khodynka Tragedy: A mass panic on Khodynka Field in Moscow during the festivities of the coronation of Russian Tsar Nicholas II results in the deaths of 1,389 people.
1900 – The United Kingdom proclaims a protectorate over Tonga.

1901–present
1912 – The first Indian film, Shree Pundalik by Dadasaheb Torne, is released in Mumbai.
1917 – World War I: The Selective Service Act of 1917 is passed, giving the President of the United States the power of conscription.
1926 – Evangelist Aimee Semple McPherson disappears in Venice, California.
1927 – The Bath School disaster: Forty-five people, including many children, are killed by bombs planted by a disgruntled school-board member in Bath Township, Michigan.
  1927   – After being founded for 20 years, the Nationalist government approves Tongji University to be among the first national universities of the Republic of China.
1933 – New Deal: President Franklin D. Roosevelt signs an act creating the Tennessee Valley Authority.
1944 – World War II: Battle of Monte Cassino: Conclusion after seven days of the fourth battle as German paratroopers evacuate Monte Cassino.
  1944   – Deportation of Crimean Tatars by the Soviet Union.
1948 – The First Legislative Yuan of the Republic of China officially convenes in Nanking.
1953 – Jacqueline Cochran becomes the first woman to break the sound barrier.
1955 – Operation Passage to Freedom, the evacuation of 310,000 Vietnamese civilians, soldiers and non-Vietnamese members of the French Army from communist North Vietnam to South Vietnam following the end of the First Indochina War, ends.
1965 – Israeli spy Eli Cohen is hanged in Damascus, Syria.
1969 – Apollo program: Apollo 10 is launched.
1973 – Aeroflot Flight 109 is hijacked mid-flight and the aircraft is subsequently destroyed when the hijacker's bomb explodes, killing all 82 people on board.
1974 – Nuclear weapons testing: Under project Smiling Buddha, India successfully detonates its first nuclear weapon becoming the sixth nation to do so.
1977 – Likud party wins the 1977 Israeli legislative election, with Menachem Begin, its founder, as the sixth Prime Minister of Israel.
1980 – Mount St. Helens erupts in Washington, United States, killing 57 people and causing $3 billion in damage.
  1980   – Students in Gwangju, South Korea begin demonstrations calling for democratic reforms.
1990 – In France, a modified TGV train achieves a new rail world speed record of 515.3 km/h (320.2 mph).
1991 – Northern Somalia declares independence from the rest of Somalia as the Republic of Somaliland.
1993 – Riots in Nørrebro, Copenhagen, caused by the approval of the four Danish exceptions in the Maastricht Treaty referendum. Police open fire against civilians for the first time since World War II and injure 11 demonstrators. 
1994 – Israeli troops finish withdrawing from the Gaza Strip, ceding the area to the Palestinian National Authority to govern.
2005 – A second photo from the Hubble Space Telescope confirms that Pluto has two additional moons, Nix and Hydra.
2006 – The post Loktantra Andolan government passes a landmark bill curtailing the power of the monarchy and making Nepal a secular country.
2009 – The LTTE are defeated by the Sri Lankan government, ending almost 26 years of fighting between the two sides.
2015 – At least 78 people die in a landslide caused by heavy rains in the Colombian town of Salgar.
2018 – A school shooting at Santa Fe High School in Texas kills ten people.
2019 – United States presidential election: Joe Biden announces his presidential campaign.

Births

Pre-1600
1048 – Omar Khayyám, Persian mathematician, astronomer, and poet (d. 1131)
1186 – Konstantin of Rostov (d. 1218)
1450 – Piero Soderini, Italian politician and diplomat (d. 1513)
1537 – Guido Luca Ferrero, Roman Catholic cardinal (d. 1585)

1601–1900
1631 – Stanislaus Papczyński, Polish priest and saint (d. 1701)
1662 – George Smalridge, English bishop (d. 1719)
1692 – (O.S.) Joseph Butler, English bishop, theologian, and apologist (d. 1752)
1711 – Roger Joseph Boscovich, Ragusan physicist, astronomer, and mathematician (d. 1787)
1777 – John George Children, English chemist, mineralogist, and zoologist (d. 1852)
1778 – Charles Vane, 3rd Marquess of Londonderry, Irish soldier and diplomat, British Ambassador to Austria (d. 1854)
1785 – John Wilson, Scottish author and critic (d. 1854)
1797 – Frederick Augustus II of Saxony (d. 1854)
1822 – Mathew Brady, American photographer and journalist (d. 1896)
1835 – Charles N. Sims, American Methodist preacher and 3rd chancellor of Syracuse University (d. 1908)
1850 – Oliver Heaviside, English engineer, mathematician, and physicist (d. 1925)
1851 – James Budd, American lawyer and politician, 19th Governor of California (d. 1908)
  1851   – Simon Kahquados, Potawatomi political activist (d. 1930)
1852 – Gertrude Käsebier, American photographer (d. 1934)
1854 – Bernard Zweers, Dutch composer and educator (d. 1924)
1855 – Francis Bellamy, American minister and author (d. 1931)
1862 – Josephus Daniels, American publisher and politician, 41st United States Secretary of the Navy (d. 1948)
1867 – Minakata Kumagusu, Japanese author, biologist, naturalist and ethnologist (d. 1941) 
1868 – Nicholas II of Russia (d. 1918)
1869 – Lucy Beaumont, English-American actress (d. 1937)
1871 – Denis Horgan, Irish shot putter and weight thrower (d. 1922)
1872 – Bertrand Russell, British mathematician, historian, and philosopher, Nobel Prize laureate (d. 1970)
1876 – Hermann Müller, German journalist and politician, 12th Chancellor of Germany (d. 1931)
1878 – Johannes Terwogt, Dutch rower (d. 1977)
1882 – Babe Adams, American baseball player, manager, and journalist (d. 1968)
1883 – Eurico Gaspar Dutra, Brazilian marshal and politician, 16th President of Brazil (d. 1974)
  1883   – Walter Gropius, German-American architect, designed the John F. Kennedy Federal Building (d. 1969)
1886 – Jeanie MacPherson, American actress and screenwriter (d. 1946)
1889 – Thomas Midgley, Jr., American chemist and engineer (d. 1944)
1891 – Rudolf Carnap, German-American philosopher and academic (d. 1970)
1892 – Ezio Pinza, Italian-American actor and singer (d. 1957)
1895 – Augusto César Sandino, Nicaraguan rebel leader (d. 1934)
1896 – Eric Backman, Swedish runner (d. 1965)
1897 – Frank Capra, Italian-American director, producer, and screenwriter (d. 1991)
1898 – Faruk Nafiz Çamlıbel, Turkish poet, author, and playwright (d. 1973)

1901–present
1901 – Henri Sauguet, French composer (d. 1989)
  1901   – Vincent du Vigneaud, American biochemist and academic, Nobel Prize laureate (d. 1978)
1902 – Meredith Willson, American playwright and composer (d. 1984)
1904 – Jacob K. Javits, American colonel and politician, 58th New York Attorney General (d. 1986)
  1904   – Shunryū Suzuki, Japanese-American monk and educator (d. 1971)
1905 – Ruth Alexander, pioneering American pilot (d. 1930)
  1905   – Hedley Verity, English cricketer and soldier (d. 1943)
1907 – Irene Hunt, American author and educator (d. 2001)
1909 – Fred Perry, English tennis player and academic (d. 1995)
1910 – Ester Boserup, Danish economist and author (d. 1999)
1911 – Big Joe Turner, American blues/R&B singer (d. 1985) 
1912 – Richard Brooks, American director, producer, and screenwriter (d. 1992)
  1912   – Perry Como, American singer and television host (d. 2001)
  1912   – Walter Sisulu, South African politician (d. 2003)
1913 – Jane Birdwood, Baroness Birdwood, Canadian-English publisher and politician (d. 2000)
1914 – Pierre Balmain, French fashion designer, founded Balmain (d. 1982)
  1914   – Boris Christoff, Bulgarian-Italian opera singer (d. 1993)
1917 – Bill Everett, American author and illustrator (d. 1973)
1919 – Margot Fonteyn, British ballerina (d. 1991)
1920 – Pope John Paul II (d. 2005)
1921 – Michael A. Epstein, English pathologist and academic
1922 – Bill Macy, American actor (d. 2019)
  1922   – Kai Winding, Danish-American trombonist and composer (d. 1983)
1923 – Jean-Louis Roux, Canadian actor and politician, 34th Lieutenant Governor of Quebec (d. 2013)
  1923   – Hugh Shearer, Jamaican journalist and politician, 3rd Prime Minister of Jamaica (d. 2004)
1924 – Priscilla Pointer, American actress
  1924   – Jack Whitaker, American sportscaster (d. 2019) 
1925 – Lillian Hoban, American author and illustrator (d. 1998)
1927 – Richard Body, English politician (d. 2018)
  1927   – Ray Nagel, American football player and coach (d. 2015)
1928 – Pernell Roberts, American actor (d. 2010)
1929 – Jack Sanford, American baseball player and coach (d. 2000)
  1929   – Norman St John-Stevas, Baron St John of Fawsley, English lawyer and politician, Chancellor of the Duchy of Lancaster (d. 2012)
1930 – Warren Rudman, American soldier, lawyer, and politician (d. 2012)
  1930   – Fred Saberhagen, American soldier and author (d. 2007)
1931 – Don Martin, American cartoonist (d. 2000)
  1931   – Robert Morse, American actor (d. 2022)
  1931   – Kalju Pitksaar, Estonian chess player (d. 1995)
  1931   – Clément Vincent, Canadian farmer and politician (d. 2018)
1933 – Bernadette Chirac, French politician, First Lady of France
  1933   – H. D. Deve Gowda, Indian farmer and politician, 11th Prime Minister of India
  1933   – Don Whillans, English rock climber and mountaineer (d. 1985)
1934 – Dwayne Hickman, American actor and director (d. 2022)
1936 – Leon Ashley, American singer-songwriter (d. 2013)
  1936   – Türker İnanoğlu, Turkish director, producer, and screenwriter
  1936   – Michael Sandle, English sculptor and academic
1937 – Brooks Robinson, American baseball player and sportscaster
  1937   – Jacques Santer, Luxembourger jurist and politician, 22nd Prime Minister of Luxembourg
1938 – Janet Fish, American painter and academic
1939 – Patrick Cormack, Baron Cormack, English historian, journalist, and politician
  1939   – Giovanni Falcone, Italian lawyer and judge (d. 1992)
  1939   – Gordon O'Connor, Canadian general and politician, 38th Canadian Minister of Defence
1940 – Erico Aumentado, Filipino journalist, lawyer, and politician (d. 2012)
1941 – Gino Brito, Canadian wrestler and promoter
  1941   – Malcolm Longair, Scottish astronomer, physicist, and academic
  1941   – Miriam Margolyes, English-Australian actress and singer
1942 – Nobby Stiles, English footballer, coach, and manager (d. 2020)
1944 – Albert Hammond, English singer-songwriter, guitarist, and producer 
  1944   – W. G. Sebald, German novelist, essayist, and poet (d. 2001)
1946 – Frank Hsieh, Taiwanese lawyer and politician, 40th Premier of the Republic of China
  1946   – Reggie Jackson, American baseball player and sportscaster
  1946   – Gerd Langguth, German political scientist and author (d. 2013)
1947 – John Bruton, Irish politician, 10th Taoiseach of Ireland
  1947   – Gail Strickland, American actress
1948 – Joe Bonsall, American country/gospel singer 
  1948   – Yi Mun-yol, South Korean author and academic
  1948   – Richard Swedberg, Swedish sociologist and academic
  1948   – Tom Udall, American lawyer and politician, 28th New Mexico Attorney General, United States Senator from New Mexico
1949 – Rick Wakeman, English progressive rock keyboardist and songwriter (Yes)
  1949   – Walter Hawkins, American gospel music singer and pastor (d. 2010)
1950 – Rod Milburn, American hurdler and coach (d. 1997)
  1950   – Mark Mothersbaugh, American singer-songwriter and painter 
1951 – Richard Clapton, Australian singer-songwriter and guitarist
  1951   – Jim Sundberg, American baseball player and sportscaster
  1951   – Angela Voigt, German long jumper (d. 2013)
1952 – Diane Duane, American author and screenwriter
  1952   – David Leakey, English general and politician
  1952   – George Strait, American singer, guitarist and producer
  1952   – Jeana Yeager, American pilot
1953 – Alan Kupperberg, American author and illustrator (d. 2015)
1954 – Wreckless Eric, English singer-songwriter and guitarist
  1954   – Eric Gerets, Belgian footballer and manager 
1955 – Chow Yun-fat, Hong Kong actor and screenwriter
1956 – Catherine Corsini, French director and screenwriter
  1956   – John Godber, English playwright and screenwriter
1957 – Michael Cretu, Romanian-German keyboard player and producer 
  1957   – Henrietta Moore, English anthropologist and academic
1958 – Rubén Omar Romano, Argentinian-Mexican footballer and coach
  1958   – Toyah Willcox, English singer-songwriter, producer, and actress 
1959 – Graham Dilley, English cricketer and coach (d. 2011)
  1959   – Jay Wells, Canadian ice hockey player and coach
1960 – Brent Ashton, Canadian ice hockey player and coach
  1960   – Jari Kurri, Finnish ice hockey player, coach, and manager
  1960   – Yannick Noah, French tennis player
1961 – Russell Senior, English singer-songwriter and guitarist
1963 – Marty McSorley, Canadian ice hockey player and coach
  1963   – Sam Vincent, American basketball player and coach
1964 – Ignasi Guardans, Spanish academic and politician
1966 – Renata Nielsen, Polish-Danish long jumper and coach
  1966   – Michael Tait, American singer-songwriter and producer 
1967 – Nina Björk, Swedish journalist and author
  1967   – Heinz-Harald Frentzen, German race car driver
  1967   – Nancy Juvonen, American screenwriter and producer, co-founded Flower Films
  1967   – Mimi Macpherson, Australian environmentalist, entrepreneur and celebrity
1968 – Philippe Benetton, French rugby player
  1968   – Ralf Kelleners, German race car driver
1969 – Troy Cassar-Daley, Australian singer-songwriter and guitarist
  1969   – Martika, American singer-songwriter, producer, and actress 
  1969   – Antônio Carlos Zago, Brazilian footballer and manager
1970 – Tina Fey, American actress, producer, and screenwriter
  1970   – Tim Horan, Australian rugby player and sportscaster
  1970   – Billy Howerdel, American guitarist, songwriter, and producer 
  1970   – Javier Cárdenas, Spanish singer, television and radio presenter
  1970   – Vicky Sunohara, Canadian former ice hockey player
1971 – Brad Friedel, American international soccer player, manager and sportscaster
  1971   – Mark Menzies, Scottish politician
  1971   – Nobuteru Taniguchi, Japanese race car driver
1972 – Turner Stevenson, Canadian ice hockey player and coach
1973 – Donyell Marshall, American basketball player and coach
  1973   – Aleksandr Olerski, Estonian footballer (d. 2011)
1974 – Nelson Figueroa, American baseball player and sportscaster
1975 – Jem, Welsh singer-songwriter and producer
  1975   – John Higgins, Scottish snooker player
  1975   – Jack Johnson, American singer-songwriter and guitarist
1976 – Ron Mercer, American basketball player
  1976   – Marko Tomasović, Croatian pianist and composer 
  1976   – Oleg Tverdovsky, Ukrainian-Russian ice hockey player
1977 – Lee Hendrie, English footballer
  1977   – Danny Mills, English footballer and sportscaster
  1977   – Li Tie, Chinese footballer and manager
1978 – Ricardo Carvalho, Portuguese footballer
  1978   – Marcus Giles, American baseball player
  1978   – Charles Kamathi, Kenyan runner
1979 – Jens Bergensten, Swedish video game designer, co-designed Minecraft
  1979   – Mariusz Lewandowski, Polish footballer
  1979   – Michal Martikán, Slovak slalom canoeist
  1979   – Milivoje Novaković, Slovenian footballer
  1979   – Julián Speroni, Argentinian footballer
1980 – Reggie Evans, American basketball player
  1980   – Michaël Llodra, French tennis player
  1980   – Diego Pérez, Uruguayan footballer
1981 – Mahamadou Diarra, Malian international footballer 
  1981   – Ashley Harrison, Australian rugby league player
1982 – Jason Brown, English footballer
  1982   – Marie-Ève Pelletier, Canadian tennis player
1983 – Gary O'Neil, English footballer
  1983   – Luis Terrero, Dominican baseball player
  1983   – Vince Young, American football player
1984 – Ivet Lalova, Bulgarian sprinter
  1984   – Simon Pagenaud, French race car driver
  1984   – Darius Šilinskis, Lithuanian basketball player
  1984   – Joakim Soria, Mexican baseball player
  1984   – Niki Terpstra, Dutch cyclist
1985 – Oliver Sin, Hungarian painter
  1985   – Henrique Sereno, Portuguese footballer
  1986   – Kevin Anderson, South African tennis player
1988 – Taeyang, South Korean singer
1990 – Dimitri Daeseleire, Belgian footballer
  1990   – Yuya Osako, Japanese footballer
  1990   – Josh Starling, Australian rugby league player
1992 – Adwoa Aboah, British fashion model
1993 – Stuart Percy, Canadian ice hockey player
  1993   – Jessica Watson, Australian sailor
1998 – Polina Edmunds, American figure skater
1999 – Laura Omloop, Belgian singer-songwriter
2000 – Ryan Sessegnon, English footballer 
  2000   – Steven Sessegnon, English footballer 
2001 – Emma Navarro, American tennis player 
2002 – Alina Zagitova, Russian figure skater
2009 – Hala Finley, American actress

Deaths

Pre-1600
 526 – Pope John I
 893 – Stephen I of Constantinople (b. 867)
 932 – Ma Shaohong, general of Later Tang
 947 – Emperor Taizong of the Liao Dynasty
 978 – Frederick I, duke of Upper Lorraine
1065 – Frederick, Duke of Lower Lorraine (b. c. 1003)
1096 – Minna of Worms, Jewish martyr killed during the Worms massacre (1096)
1160 – Eric Jedvardsson (King Eric IX) of Sweden (since 1156); (b. circa 1120)
1297 – Nicholas Longespee, Bishop of Salisbury
1401 – Vladislaus II of Opole (b. 1332)
1410 – Rupert of Germany, Count Palatine of the Rhine (b. 1352)
1550 – Jean, Cardinal of Lorraine (b. 1498)
1551 – Domenico di Pace Beccafumi, Italian painter (b. 1486)

1601–1900
1675 – Stanisław Lubieniecki, Polish astronomer, historian, and theologian (b. 1623)
  1675   – Jacques Marquette, French-American missionary and explorer (b. 1637)
1692 – Elias Ashmole, English astrologer and politician (b. 1617)
1721 – Maria Barbara Carillo, victim of the Spanish Inquisition (b.1625)
1733 – Georg Böhm, German organist and composer (b. 1761)
1780 – Charles Hardy, English-American admiral and politician, 29th Colonial Governor of New York (b. 1714)
1781 – Túpac Amaru II, Peruvian-Indian rebel leader (b. 1742)
1792 – Levy Solomons, Canadian merchant and fur trader (b. 1730)
1795 – Robert Rogers, English colonel (b. 1731)
1799 – Pierre Beaumarchais, French playwright and publisher (b. 1732)
1800 – Alexander Suvorov, Russian general (b. 1729)
1807 – John Douglas, Scottish bishop and scholar (b. 1721)
1808 – Elijah Craig, American minister, inventor, and educator, invented Bourbon whiskey (b. 1738)
1844 – Richard McCarty, American lawyer and politician (b. 1780)
1853 – Lionel Kieseritzky, Estonian-French chess player (b. 1806)
1867 – Clarkson Stanfield, English painter (b. 1793)
1889 – Isabella Glyn, Scottish-English actress (b. 1823)
1900 – Félix Ravaisson-Mollien, French archaeologist and philosopher (b. 1813)

1901–present
1908 – Louis-Napoléon Casault, Canadian lawyer, judge, and politician (b. 1823)
1909 – Isaac Albéniz, Spanish pianist and composer (b. 1860)
  1909   – George Meredith, English novelist and poet (b. 1828)
1910 – Eliza Orzeszkowa, Polish author and publisher (b. 1841)
  1910   – Pauline Viardot, French soprano and composer (b. 1821)
1911 – Gustav Mahler, Austrian composer and conductor (b. 1860)
1916 – Chen Qimei, Chinese revolutionary (b. 1878)
1922 – Charles Louis Alphonse Laveran, French physician and parasitologist, Nobel Prize laureate (b. 1845)
1941 – Werner Sombart, German economist and sociologist (b. 1863)
1943 – Ōnishiki Daigorō, Japanese sumo wrestler, the 28th Yokozuna (b. 1883)
1947 – Hal Chase, American baseball player and manager (b. 1883)
1955 – Mary McLeod Bethune, American educator and activist (b. 1875)
1956 – Maurice Tate, English cricketer (b. 1895)
1958 – Jacob Fichman, Israeli poet and critic (b. 1881)
1963 – Ernie Davis, American football player, coach, and manager (b. 1939)
1968 – Frank Walsh, Australian politician, 34th Premier of South Australia (b. 1897)
1971 – Aleksandr Gennadievich Kurosh, Russian mathematician and theorist (b. 1908)
1973 – Jeannette Rankin, American social worker and politician (b. 1880)
1974 – Harry Ricardo, English engine designer and researcher (b. 1885)
1975 – Leroy Anderson, American composer and conductor (b. 1908)
1980 – Victims of Mount St. Helens eruption:
Reid Blackburn, American photographer and journalist (b. 1952)
David A. Johnston, American volcanologist and geologist (b. 1949)
  1980   – Ian Curtis, English singer-songwriter (b. 1956)
1981 – Arthur O'Connell, American actor (b. 1908)
  1981   – William Saroyan, American novelist, playwright, and short story writer (b. 1908)
1987 – Mahdi Amel, Lebanese journalist, poet, and academic (b. 1936)
1989 – Dorothy Ruth, American horse breeder and author (b. 1921)
1990 – Jill Ireland, English actress (b. 1936)
1995 – Elisha Cook, Jr., American actor (b. 1903)
  1995   – Alexander Godunov, Russian-American ballet dancer and actor (b. 1949)
  1995   – Brinsley Le Poer Trench, 8th Earl of Clancarty, Irish ufologist and historian (b. 1911)
  1995   – Elizabeth Montgomery, American actress (b. 1933)
1998 – Obaidullah Aleem, Indian-Pakistani poet and author (b. 1939)
1999 – Augustus Pablo, Jamaican singer, keyboard player, and producer (b. 1954)
  1999   – Betty Robinson, American runner (b. 1911)
2000 – Stephen M. Wolownik, Russian-American composer and musicologist (b. 1946)
2001 – Irene Hunt, American author and illustrator (b. 1907)
2004 – Elvin Jones, American drummer and bandleader (b. 1927)
2006 – Jaan Eilart, Estonian geographer, ecologist, and historian (b. 1933)
2007 – Pierre-Gilles de Gennes, French physicist and academic, Nobel Prize laureate (b. 1932)
2008 – Joseph Pevney, American actor and director (b. 1911)
  2008   – Roberto García-Calvo Montiel, Spanish judge (b. 1942)
2009 – Dolla, American rapper (b. 1987)
  2009   – Wayne Allwine, American voice actor, sound effects editor and foley artist (b. 1947)   
  2009   – Velupillai Prabhakaran, Sri Lankan rebel leader, founded the Liberation Tigers of Tamil Eelam (b. 1954)
2012 – Dietrich Fischer-Dieskau, German opera singer and conductor (b. 1925)
  2012   – Peter Jones, English-Australian drummer and songwriter (b. 1967)
  2012   – Alan Oakley, English bicycle designer, designed the Raleigh Chopper (b. 1927)
2013 – Aleksei Balabanov, Russian director and screenwriter (b. 1959)
  2013   – Jo Benkow, Norwegian soldier and politician (b. 1924)
  2013   – Steve Forrest, American actor (b. 1925)
  2013   – David McMillan, American football player (b. 1981)
  2013   – Lothar Schmid, German chess player (b. 1928)
2014 – Dobrica Ćosić, Serbian politician, 1st President of the Federal Republic of Yugoslavia (b. 1921)
  2014   – Hans-Peter Dürr, German physicist and academic (b. 1929)
  2014   – Kaiketsu Masateru, Japanese sumo wrestler (b. 1948)
  2014   – Chukwuedu Nwokolo, Nigerian physician and academic (b. 1921)
  2014   – Wubbo Ockels, Dutch physicist and astronaut (b. 1946)
2015 – Halldór Ásgrímsson, Icelandic accountant and politician, 22nd Prime Minister of Iceland (b. 1947)
  2015   – Raymond Gosling, English physicist and academic (b. 1926)
  2015   – Jean-François Théodore, French businessman (b. 1946)
2017 – Roger Ailes, American businessman (b. 1940)
  2017   – Jacque Fresco, American engineer and academic (b. 1916)
  2017   – Chris Cornell, American singer (b. 1964)
2019 – Austin Eubanks, American addiction recovery advocate, survivor of the Columbine shooting (b. 1981)
2020 – Ken Osmond, American actor and police officer (b. 1943)
2021 – Charles Grodin, American actor and talk show host (b. 1935)
  2021   – Yolanda Tortolero, Venezuelan politician

Holidays and observances
Christian feast day:
Ælfgifu of Shaftesbury
Eric IX of Sweden
Felix of Cantalice
Pope John I
Venantius of Camerino
May 18 (Eastern Orthodox liturgics)
Baltic Fleet Day (Russia)
Day of Remembrance of Crimean Tatar genocide (Ukraine)
Independence Day (Somaliland) (unrecognized)
International Museum Day
National Speech Pathologist Day (United States)
Mullivaikkal Remembrance Day (Sri Lankan Tamils)
Revival, Unity, and Poetry of Magtymguly Day (Turkmenistan)
Teacher's Day (Syria)
Victory Day (Sri Lanka)
Remembrance Day (Sri Lanka)

References

External links

 BBC: On This Day
 
 Historical Events on May 18

Days of the year
May